Fu Yi (born November 1953) is a major general in the People's Liberation Army of China. He was detained by Chinese military authorities in January 2015, suspected of corruption.

Chinese media reported that he had close relations with Guo Zhenggang, the son of Guo Boxiong, a retired former vice-chairman of the Central Military Commission, China's top military body.

Biography
Fu was born and raised in Nanjing, Jiangsu, with his ancestral home in Jiang County, Shanxi.

He joined the Chinese Communist Party in August 1971 and joined the People's Liberation Army in March 1969. Fu started his military career in 1980 in Nanjing Military Region.

He served as Chief of staff of the 1st Group Army, Deputy Commander of Lüshun Base of the North Sea Fleet, and Deputy Army Commander of the 12th Army before serving as Commander of Zhejiang Military Command.

Fu retired in November 2013. In March 2015, Chinese media reported that Fu was detained for investigation by military prosecution authorities.

References

1953 births
People from Nanjing
Living people
People's Liberation Army generals from Jiangsu